Veterans Administration Hospital or Veterans Administration Medical Center is a term used to refer to one of the medical facilities operated by the Veterans Health Administration, a division of the U.S. Department of Veterans Affairs.

It may refer to one of the following specific medical facilities or former medical facilities:

Albuquerque Veterans Administration Medical Center, Albuquerque, New Mexico, listed on the NRHP in Bernalillo County, New Mexico
Biloxi Veterans Administration Medical Center, Biloxi, Mississippi, listed on the NRHP in Harrison County, Mississippi 
Fort Whipple-Department of Veterans Affairs Medical Center Historic District, Prescott, Arizona, listed on the NRHP in Prescott, Arizona
Knoxville Veterans Administration Hospital Historic District, Knoxville, Iowa, listed on the NRHP in Marion County, Iowa 
Montana Veterans and Pioneers Memorial Building, Helena, Montana, listed on the NRHP in Lewis and Clark County, Montana
Oteen Veterans Administration Hospital Historic District, Asheville, North Carolina
Veterans Administration Hospital (California State University), Long Beach, California
Veterans Administration Hospital (Jefferson Barracks), Lemay, Missouri
Veterans Administration Hospital (Little Rock, Arkansas), listed on the National Register of Historic Places in Pulaski County, Arkansas
Veterans Administration Hospital (Salt Lake City, Utah), listed on the National Register of Historic Places in Salt Lake County, Utah
Veterans Administration Hospital Historic District, Waco, Texas, listed on the NRHP in McLennan County, Texas
Veterans Administration Medical Center (Alexandria, Louisiana), listed on the NRHP in Rapides Parish, Louisiana
Veterans Administration Medical Center (Grant County, Indiana)

See also
 List of Veterans Affairs medical facilities